Frederick Haycock (1886–1955) was an English professional footballer who scored 13 goals from 40 appearances in the English Football League playing as a forward for West Bromwich Albion and Lincoln City.

Career
Haycock was born in Smethwick, then in Staffordshire. He began his professional career in the 1904–05 season, playing in the Football League Second Division for West Bromwich Albion. After a couple of years he left the club to join Crewe Alexandra of the Birmingham & District League, and then Southern League clubs Luton Town and Portsmouth, before returning to the Football League with Lincoln City in 1910. In his only season with the club, Haycock was their leading scorer, albeit with only six goals from League and FA Cup games as the team finished bottom of the League. He moved on to Port Vale of the Central League in August 1911. A regular in the first 11, he was part of the side that won the Staffordshire Senior Cup in 1912. He then moved back to the Birmingham & District with Dudley Town at the end of the 1911–12 season, later joining Shrewsbury Town. Haycock died in 1955.

Career statistics
Source:

Notes
A. : The Lincoln City FC Archive gives his full name as George Frederick, whereas Joyce has Frederick J.

References

1886 births
1955 deaths
Sportspeople from Smethwick
English footballers
Association football forwards
Coombs Wood F.C. players
West Bromwich Albion F.C. players
Crewe Alexandra F.C. players
Luton Town F.C. players
Portsmouth F.C. players
Lincoln City F.C. players
Port Vale F.C. players
Dudley Town F.C. players
Shrewsbury Town F.C. players
English Football League players
Southern Football League players